DHA Cinema (or Defence Housing Authority Cinema) is a movie theatre in Lahore, Pakistan. It is located in DHA, running by DHA administration.

References

External links 
 DHA Cinema's official website
 DHA Lahore's official website

Cinemas and movie theatres in Pakistan
Defence, Lahore
Culture in Lahore
Pakistan Army